New Haven Community Schools is a school district based out of New Haven, Michigan in the Metro Detroit area. It serves all of New Haven, as well as portions of Lenox, Ray, Macomb, and Chesterfield townships.

Schools

Secondary schools
 New Haven High School
 Endeavour Middle School

Elementary schools
 New Haven Elementary School
 Endeavour Elementary School

References

External links

New Haven Community Schools Home Page

Education in Macomb County, Michigan
School districts in Michigan